The 1989–90 season was FC Dinamo București's 41st season in Divizia A. In this season, Dinamo made the double, stopping Steaua's supremacy in Romania. In Europe, Dinamo reached the semifinals of the Cup Winners' Cup, where it is defeated by Anderlecht. It was a special season because of the Romanian Revolution of 1989. Dinamo dominated the first half of the season, winning the derby with Steaua, 3–0, on its ground. It was the first defeat for Steaua in the Romanian championship after 104 consecutive games. In the winter break, after the Revolution, Dinamo suffered administrative changes, for a few days having a different name – Unirea Tricolor.

In the final of the season, because of the Romanian national team's qualification at the 1990 World Cup in Italy, FRF decided that the teams shall not use the chooseable players. However, in the game between Dinamo and Farul, Răducioiu and Lupu, respectively Marian Popa had played, managers and coaches of both clubs (Vasile Ianul and Lucescu for Dinamo) were suspended for three months, and the match, won by Dinamo 2-1 was replayed. To stay on the bench next stage Lucescu registered as a player, and even took the field, becoming at 45 years old, the oldest player in league history.

Results

Romanian Cup final

Cup Winners' Cup 

First round

Dinamo București won 2–1 on aggregate

Second round

Dinamo București won 8–1 on aggregate

Quarterfinals

Dinamo București won 4–1 on aggregate

Semifinals

Anderlecht won 2-0 on aggregate

Squad 

Goalkeepers: Bogdan Stelea (22 / 0); Costel Câmpeanu (10 / 0); Sorin Colceag (1 / 0).
Defenders: Alpár Mészáros (15 / 1); Ioan Andone (20 / 2); Mircea Rednic (19 / 1); Michael Klein (23 / 2); Iulian Mihăescu (24 / 7); Anton Doboș (21 / 1); Adrian Matei (10 / 0); Florin Jelea (1 / 0); Adrian Slave (1 / 0); Cornel Mirea (12 / 0); Alexandru Nicolae (5 / 0); Mihail Cristian Țicu (3 / 0); Claudiu Jijie (1 / 0).
Midfielders:  Ioan Sabău (24 / 5); Dorin Mateuț (22 / 9); Ioan Lupescu (29 / 4); Dănuț Lupu (22 / 6); Daniel Timofte (20 / 8); Cristian Lazăr (11 / 2); Ionel Fulga (7 / 3); Mihai Stoica (7 / 0); George Radu (5 / 0).
Forwards: Claudiu Vaișcovici (21 / 14); Cezar Zamfir (21 / 6); Florin Răducioiu (24 / 14); Marian Damaschin (5 / 1); Mircea Lucescu (1 / 0); Marian Năstase (3 / 0); Nicu Glonț (1 / 0).
(league appearances and goals listed in brackets)

Manager: Mircea Lucescu.

Transfers 

In the summer break, Dinamo brought Daniel Timofte from Jiul Petroșani and Anton Doboș from U.Cluj. Left the team Lică Movilă to Flacăra Moreni, Bogdan Bucur to Inter Sibiu, Rodion Cămătaru to Racing Charleroi and Dumitru Moraru to Vålerenga. Other two players, Gheorghe Viscreanu and Marcel Sabou, went to Spain. In the winter break, came to Dinamo Alexandru Nicolae from Victoria, Constantin Lazăr from Chimia Râmnicu Vâlcea and Mihai Stoica from FC Argeş.

Squad set for Torneo di Viareggio - 1989

Paul Barariu, Adrian Bondoc, Corneliu Buțerchi, Sorin Colceag, Vasile Ghernescu, Vicentiu Iorgulescu, Răzvan Lucescu, Marian Năstase, Catalin Necula, Cristian Petre, Gabriel Răduță, Cristian Serban, Adrian Slave, Constantin Stănici, Mihail Țicu, Adrian Titeica.
Team Manager: Tatasescu

References 

 www.labtof.ro
 www.romaniansoccer.ro
 

FC Dinamo București seasons
Dinamo Bucuresti
Romanian football championship-winning seasons